Acharya Rajendrasuri was a Svetambara Jain monk and reformer of monk traditions of the 19th century. He wrote many books on Jainism including अभिधान राजेंद्र कोष

Early life
Acharya Rajendrasuri was born to businessman Rishabhadas Parakh and Keshardevi. His birth name was Ratna Raj. He was born on 3 December 1827. He had 1 sister and 1 brother   at Bharatpur, Rajasthan.

Ascetic life
He was initiated as a Jain yati (a Jain monk who stays in the same place) by Hemavijay at Udaipur on Vaishakh Shukla 5 Vikram Samvat 1904 (in 1848 CE) and given a new name, Ratnavijay. He was the first yati initiated in the 19th century. Later his name was changed to Rajendrasuri upon his elevation to acharya rank.

He studied under Pramodsuri and Jain yati monk Sagarchand. Dharanendrasuri, impressed by his scholarship, appointed him as his daftari. Ratnavijay was disappointed with the luxurious life of Dharanendrasuri and left him in 1864 AD. Later he became the leader of Tapa Gaccha.

He led a movement in 1880 to reform yati tradition at Jaora, resulting in near extinction of it. He opposed the luxurious life of the Jain yatis, contradictory to Jain principles of non-possession and non-violence. He issued a nine-point manifesto known as Nav-kalama. He explained nine principles to reform Jain yati tradition. His manifesto was accepted after some initial opposition. Many leading yati and monks gave up their luxurious life and started following Jain principles. He established Agama or Samakit Gaccha, later known as Tristutik Gaccha.

He restored and reconstructed some Jain temples and consecrated 1023 icons of Tirthankaras. He visited Rajasthan and Malwa where he delivered religious discourses in Malwi, Marwari languages. He also opposed worship of other gods and goddesses over the worship of Tirthankars.

Rajendrasuri died on 21 December 1906 (Vikram Samvat 1963 Pous Shukla Saptami) at Mohankheda, Dhar, Madhya Pradesh. Later, Mohankheda became a centre for learning and a tirtha around 1940.

Works

Rajendrasuri wrote, collected and edited some Jain works. He compiled the Prakrit dictionary, Abhidhānarājaindrakōśa'', in seven volumes with 9,200 pages describing 60,000 terms.

His works include:
 Abhidhānarājaindrakōśa
 Prakrit Vyakruti (Commentary on Grammar)
 Kalpasutra Prabodhini (Commentary on the Kalpasutra)
 Khartar Taskar Prabandh (Unpublished)
 Bhagawati Sutra Sateek
 Gachchhar Payanna
 Terapanth Prashnottar Vichara
 Mahanishitha Sutra (fifth)
 Brahata sangrihani
 Upasaka Dashanga Sutra
 Prakrit Shabda Rupawali
 Deepmalika Katha (Story of Diwali)
 Holika Katha (Story of Holi)
 Gandhara vad
 Karma Vichar (Unpublished)
 Tatva Vichar (Unpublished)
 Kalpasutra Balavabodh
 Jinupadesh Manjiri
 Kalyanmandir Stotra (Commentary)
 Jyotirya Kalpalata
 Swarodhya-gyan and Yantravali
 Vichar-sar Prakranam
 Sanskrit Vyakarnam (Sanskrit grammar)
 Laghu Sanghgrahani
 Amarkosh (Original)
 Navpad Puja Prasnothar
 Upadhan Vidhi
 Sratakatriyam (Bhatruhari)
 Chandrika Vyakaranam
 Kavyaprakash Mulamam
 Varnamala
 Upasaka Dashang Sutra
 Ek Sou Aath bol
 Upadesh Ratna saara
 Treloyaka Deepika Yantravali
 Karna Granth (four)
 Saptati Shatasthan Yantravali
 Dwashisth Margana Yantravali
 Shada Dravya Vichara
 Siddhanta Prakash
 Asthanhika Vyakhyana
 Sindura Prakara-satika
 Bhayhara Stotra

The original copy of these books are stored in libraries of Ahor, Rajasthan; Jaora; Mohankheda, Madhya Pradesh; Tharad and Ahmedabad in Gujarat.

Recognition
Shrines dedicated to him were erected at several places in India including Mohankheda, Bhinmal, Dhanera, Jalore, Bangalore, Bijapur, Ahemdabad, Tharad, Bharatpur, Indore, Ratlam, and Santhu, Kachrod,Rajendra Nagar,Devispeta(Nellore District)etc. His death centenary was celebrated in 2006 at Mohankheda.

References

External links
 Mohankheda

Jain acharyas
Scholars from Rajasthan
Rajasthani people
People from Dhar
1827 births
1906 deaths
Indian Jain monks
19th-century Indian Jain writers
19th-century Jain monks
19th-century Indian monks
Jain reformers
Indian writers
Śvētāmbara monks